Wajood may refer to:

 Wajood (1998 film), an Indian Hindi drama by N. Chandra
 Wajood (2018 film), a Pakistani revenge thriller by Jawed Sheikh